The Cricketers Club of London was a private members club run by cricket enthusiasts.  at 71 Blandford Street, London, England; the club offered members food and wine, entertainment, visiting speakers and excursions latterly under the management of Grahame McCaffrey. 

The building also had a basement available for private hire, and a restaurant. With the relaxation of the licensing laws, like many similar clubs in London, it ceased to exist, but Ben Bickley, an old boy of Christ's Hospital, continues to run the Club as a Cricket Club, under the presidency of the famous MCC member John Fingleton, and assisted by a number of cricketers who do not believe league cricket to be the be all and end all of cricket. It has a dozen or so very pleasant fixtures a year.

References

External links

Espncricinfo.com
Royalgazette.com
 Espncricinfo.com
Cricketworld.com
Thesloaney.com

1974 establishments in the United Kingdom
Clubs and societies in London